Munno Para Downs is a northern suburb of Adelaide, South Australia in the City of Playford.

The suburb was named in 1983 from part of the district of Munno Para. The boundaries were adjusted in 2011 after the construction of the Northern Expressway. The suburb boundaries are (clockwise from western point) Northern Expressway, Angle Vale Road, Dalkeith Road, Main North Road, Alawoona Road and that alignment extended past the northern edge of the older suburb of Munno Para including Field Road and the boundaries of paddocks and orchards back to the Northern Expressway.

The area is crossed by the Gawler railway line, but there is no station in Munno Para Downs, the nearest is Kudla, north of Dalkeith Road. Dalkeith brigade of the South Australian Country Fire Service is based in Munno Para Downs on the corner of Dalkeith and Coventry Roads.

References

	

Suburbs of Adelaide